Anja Feldmann (born 8 March 1966 in Bielefeld) is a German computer scientist.

Education and career
Feldmann studied computer science at Universität Paderborn and received her degree in 1990. 
She continued her studies at Carnegie Mellon University, where she earned her M.Sc. in 1991 and her Ph.D. in 1995. 
Following four years of postdoctoral work at AT&T Labs Research, she held research positions at Saarland University and Technical University Munich.

In 2006 she was appointed as professor of Internet Network Architectures for the Telekom Innovation Laboratories at the Technische Universität Berlin. As Professor her research focused on Internet measurement, Teletraffic engineering, traffic characterization and debugging network performance issues. She has also conducted research into intrusion detection and network architecture. She has served on more than 50 committees and was the co-chair of SIGCOMM. Alex Snoeren said that she "was instrumental in the establishment of a rigorous science of Internet measurement. Among her many contributions, she is perhaps best known for her work in traffic characterization and engineering.”

Between 2009 and 2013 Feldmann was Dean of the Computer Science and Electrical Engineering department at the Technische Universität Berlin, Germany. From 2012 until early 2018 Feldmann sat on the employer side of the supervisory board of SAP. October 2017 she was appointed as director of the Max Planck Institute for Informatics, her focus will be on researching the Internet architecture.

Other activities
 Karlsruhe Institute of Technology (KIT), Member of the Supervisory Board

Honors and awards
 2009: Member of Leopoldina
 2011: Gottfried Wilhelm Leibniz Prize
 2011: Berlin Science Award

References

External links
 
 Website of the Intelligent Networks Research Group at TU Berlin
 Website T-Labs

Gottfried Wilhelm Leibniz Prize winners
1966 births
Living people
Scientists from Bielefeld
Max Planck Society people
Technical University of Munich alumni
Feldmann Anja
German women academics
German women computer scientists
German computer scientists
Network topology
Members of the German Academy of Sciences Leopoldina
Max Planck Institute directors